To All the Girls... is the 62nd studio album by country music singer-songwriter Willie Nelson, which was released on October 15, 2013, by Legacy Recordings. The tracks consist of duets recorded by Nelson with female singers, mostly from the country music genre. The album is named after the song "To All the Girls I've Loved Before", which had been a hit for Nelson and Julio Iglesias when they recorded it in 1985.

The week of its release, the album entered Billboard's Top Country Albums chart at number two, marking Nelson's highest position on the chart since 1989.  It also peaked at number nine on the Billboard 200, becoming his first top ten album on that chart since 1982.

Recording
The album consists of a collection of duets featuring Nelson along with a variety of female singers, including prominent country singers (Dolly Parton, Miranda Lambert, Loretta Lynn, Carrie Underwood, Rosanne Cash, Wynonna Judd), Americana and alternative country singers (The Secret Sisters, Brandi Carlile, Alison Krauss, Shelby Lynne, Emmylou Harris), prominent singers mostly associated with other genres (Sheryl Crow, Mavis Staples, Norah Jones) singers mostly known for being the daughters of country artists (Melonie Cannon, daughter of Buddy Cannon; Tina Rose, daughter of Leon Russell; and Nelson's own daughter Paula Nelson), and Nelson protégée Lily Meola.

Release and reception
The album was released on October 15, 2013 on Legacy Recordings.

The first single "From Here to the Moon and Back", a duet with Dolly Parton that she wrote for the 2012 movie Joyful Noise, was released on August 2, 2013. (The song also appeared on Parton's concurrent album Blue Smoke.) It was followed by the release of the single "Grandma's Hands", with Mavis Staples, on August 6. "It Won't Be Long", featuring the Secret Sisters was released on September 24; while "Somewhere Between" with Loretta Lynn was released on October 1.

Upon its full release, on October 15, 2013; the album entered Billboard's Top Country Albums at number two. It marked Nelson's highest position on the chart since the release of his 1989 album A Horse Called Music, and it extended his record to a total of forty-six top ten albums on the country charts. Nelson scored as well his second top ten album on the Billboard 200, with the release entering at number nine.

The Seattle Post-Intelligencer called the release "a wonderful album" composed by "great material", performed with "style and grace". The Telegraph rated it with four stars out of five, qualifying the diversity of music genres contained on the recordings as "impressive". The review described Nelson's guitar playing "sweet and distinctive as ever", and remarked that his voice was "holding up well". Allmusic delivered a favorable review, rating the album with three-and-a-half stars out of five. The website defined the tracks as "assured, easy, impeccably tasteful work from (Nelson) and his partners", but stated that the seventy-minute length "make(s) the album feel a little samey".

Rolling Stone offered a mixed review, rating the album with three stars out of five. The review noted that "several of the pairings [...] lament unions that couldn't work", while it remarked that Nelson "holds his unmistakable own throughout". Record Collector rated the release with four stars, calling it a "fine addition" to Nelson's collection of duets. Associated Press felt that the duets were 
"custom-made for the download age", alleging that Nelson's usual audience would not "connect with all 16 songs", calling the set "too eclectic and too inconsistent". It also remarked that "plenty of gold nuggets shine through for those willing to pick through the miscues and throwaways". Roughstock rated it with four stars and called the album "a delight" with "18 tracks of fantastic duets". The review aggregator website Metacritic gave the album a Metascore of 72/100, based on six reviews.

Track listing

Personnel

 Wayne Benson – mandolin
 Jim "Moose" Brown – Hammond B-3 organ, percussion, piano, Wurlitzer
 Buddy Cannon – acoustic guitar, background vocals
 Melonie Cannon – duet vocals on "Back To Earth"
 Brandi Carlile – duet vocals on "Making Believe"
 Rosanne Cash – duet vocals on "Please Don't Tell Me How the Story Ends"
 Chad Cromwell – drums
 Dennis Crouch – upright bass
 Sheryl Crow – duet vocals on "Far Away Places"
 Fred Eltringham – drums
 Keith Gattis – electric guitar, gut string guitar
 Steve Gibson – electric guitar
 Kevin "Swine" Grantt – upright bass

 Emmylou Harris – duet vocals on "Dry Lightning"
 Steve Herrmann – trumpet
 John Hobbs – Hammond B-3 organ, piano, string arrangements
 Mike Johnson – steel guitar
 Norah Jones – piano and duet vocals on "Walkin'"
 Wynonna Judd – duet vocals on "Bloody Mary Morning"
 Alison Krauss – duet vocals on "No Mas Amor"
 Miranda Lambert – duet vocals on "She Was No Good for Me"
 Loretta Lynn – duet vocals on "Somewhere Between"
 Shelby Lynne – duet vocals on "'Til the End of the World"
 Lily Meola – duet vocals on "Will You Remember Mine"
 The Nashville String Machine – strings
 Lukas Nelson – background vocals
 Paula Nelson – duet vocals on "Have You Ever Seen the Rain"

 Willie Nelson – acoustic guitar, lead vocals
 Dolly Parton – duet vocals on "From Here to the Moon and Back"
 Mickey Raphael – bass harmonica, echo harp, harmonica
 Lyndel Rhodes – harmonica
 Laura Rogers – vocals on "It Won't Be Very Long"
 Lydia Rogers – vocals on "It Won't Be Very Long"
 Tina Rose – duet vocals on "After the Fire Is Gone"
 John Wesley Ryles – background vocals
 Mavis Staples – duet vocals on "Grandma's Hands"
 Bobby Terry – acoustic guitar, electric guitar, gut string guitar
 Dan Tyminski – acoustic guitar, mandolin, background vocals
 Carrie Underwood – duet vocals on "Always on My Mind"
 Tommy White – steel guitar
 Kris Wilkinson – string contractor
 Lonnie Wilson – drums
 Bobby Wood – synthesizer

Chart performance

The week of its release, the album entered Billboard's Top Country Albums chart at number two, marking Nelson's highest position on the chart since 1989, as well as his second top ten album on the Billboard 200, entering at number nine. It is Nelson's 46th top ten debut, the most of any country singers on that chart. It sold 43,000 in its first week. As of January 2014, the album has sold 114,000 copies in the US.

In the UK, the album debuted at No. 72 on the album chart, selling 1,452 copies for the week.

Charts

Weekly charts

Year-end charts

References

Willie Nelson albums
2013 albums
Sony Music albums
Albums produced by Buddy Cannon